Jana Hybášková (born 26 June 1965 in Prague) is a Czech politician and diplomat, who currently serves as the Ambassador of the European Union in Namibia. She served as a Member of the European Parliament for the SNK European Democrats (part of the European People's Party) from 2004 to 2009, and as the Ambassador of the European Union in Iraq from 2011 to 2015. She was the chair of the European Democratic Party (EDS) from 2008 to 2010.

Biography
Hybášková graduated in Arabic at Charles University, earning a doctorate from the university's Faculty of Philosophy and Arts in 1989, and worked at the Foreign Ministry of Czechoslovakia and then the Czech Republic from 1991 to 1997. She was the Czech Ambassador to Slovenia from 1997–2001, and then briefly an adviser to the State Secretary for European Affairs, before becoming Ambassador to Qatar and Kuwait (2002–2004).

As a Member of the European Parliament, she was a member of the Committee on Foreign Affairs, a substitute on the Committee on Budgets and chairwoman of the European delegation for relations with Israel. She is also a member of the Steering Committee of the World Movement for Democracy. She has been critical of the Iranian government and President Mahmoud Ahmadinejad, and has advocated closer relations between Israel and Europe.
 
She is a founding signatory of the Prague Declaration on European Conscience and Communism, and the co-organizer (with Senator Martin Mejstřík) of its preceding conference. She co-sponsored the European Parliament resolution of 2 April 2009 on European conscience and totalitarianism on behalf of the European People's Party.

Decorations
 Holder of the decoration 'Záslužný kříž ministra obrany ČR II stupně' (Cross of Merit of the Minister of Defence of the Czech Republic, Second Class)

See also 
 2004 European Parliament election in the Czech Republic

References

External links

 
 

1965 births
Living people
European Democratic Party (Czech Republic) MEPs
MEPs for the Czech Republic 2004–2009
Women MEPs for the Czech Republic
Ambassadors of the Czech Republic to Qatar
Diplomats from Prague
Czech women diplomats
Politicians from Prague
Czech women ambassadors
Charles University alumni